Benjamin Franklin Hallett (December 2, 1797 – September 30, 1862) was a Massachusetts lawyer and Democratic Party activist, most notable as the first chairman of the Democratic National Committee.

Benjamin Franklin Hallett was born in Barnstable, Massachusetts. After graduating from Brown University in 1816, he studied law and began a journalistic career in Providence, Rhode Island. He soon moved to Boston, where he began with the Boston Advocate, shifting to the Boston Daily Advertiser in 1827. At that time he espoused the views of the Anti-Masonic Party, but when that particular group went out of fashion he switched to the Democratic Party as an enemy of Henry Clay. He joined and became a prominent member of the Suffolk County, Massachusetts bar.

Political career
As a candidate for Congress in 1844 and 1848 he was defeated both times by Whig Robert C. Winthrop. In the latter race Charles Sumner was also a candidate, representing the Free-Soil Party. In 1848 he became, for four years, the first Chairman of the Democratic National Committee.

In March 1853, President Franklin Pierce appointed Hallett to succeed George Lunt for a four-year term as United States District Attorney for the District of Massachusetts. At the 1856 Democratic National Convention, Hallett was chairman of the Platform Committee.

Role in the splintering of the 1860 Democratic Convention
In 1860 he was chosen as a delegate, but skipped the Charleston, South Carolina, meeting (the convention, scheduled April 23-May 3, 1860, coincided with the death of Hallett's wife, Laura Smith Larned, of bilious fever, on May 3, 1860). Trying to regain the seat he had vacated, the convention at Baltimore voted 138 to 112  to deny Hallett the seat. He then joined the walk-out Convention that nominated John C. Breckinridge and Joseph Lane.

References

1797 births
1862 deaths
Brown University alumni
Massachusetts lawyers
Democratic National Committee chairs
People from Barnstable, Massachusetts
Anti-Masonic Party politicians from Massachusetts
Massachusetts Democrats
United States Attorneys for the District of Massachusetts
19th-century American lawyers